Nagjuttuuq (Inuktitut syllabics: ᓇᒡᔪᑦᑑᖅ), formerly Vansittart Island, is one of the uninhabited Canadian arctic islands in the Kivalliq Region, Nunavut, Canada.

References

Islands of Foxe Basin
Uninhabited islands of Kivalliq Region